The Asheville Velodrome in Asheville, North Carolina, also known as the Mellowdrome, named after its gentle banking. The Mellowdrome was originally a 1/3rd mile dirt race track on the early versions of the NASCAR circuit. In 2011, the track was donated by the Carrier Family to the City of Asheville. The track and the surrounding park along the French Broad River became Carrier Park. The Mellowdrome is an official "velodrome" recognized by USA Cycling.

The Mellowdrome is open to all bicycles, both "fixed gear" track bikes, and bicycles with gears/brakes due to its gentle banking. In March 2018, a major renovation was completed and now the Mellowdrome has slightly more banking and is constructed of high quality concrete. The Mellowdrome is outside and open during daylight hours.

References

External links
Mellowdrome
Carrier Park

Velodromes in the United States